The men's 10 metre platform, also reported as high diving, was one of four diving events on the diving at the 1932 Summer Olympics programme. The competition was actually held from both 10 metre and 5 metre platforms. Divers performed four compulsory dives – running plain header forward, standing backward spring and forward somersault with pike (10 metre), standing straight  (half gainer), standing double somersault backward with tuck (5 metre) – and four dives of the competitor's choice (different from the compulsory) for a total of eight dives. The competition was held on Saturday 13 August 1932. Eight divers from five nations competed.

Results
Since there were only eight entries, instead of groups, a direct final was contested.

References

External links
  

Men
1932
Men's events at the 1932 Summer Olympics